Asunmaa is a surname. Notable people with the surname include:

 Matti Asunmaa (1921–1998), Finnish politician
 Tytti Isohookana-Asunmaa (born 1947), Finnish politician